The first of three 1949 Buenos Aires Grand Prix (official name: III Gran Premio del General Juan Perón y de la Ciudad de Buenos Aires) was a Grand Prix motor race that took place on January 30, 1949, at the Palermo street circuit in Buenos Aires, Argentina.

The event was marred by the death of popular French driver Jean-Pierre Wimille. He was driving his first flying lap during practice, when his car swerved to avoid children crossing the track, and slammed into a tree. He died instantly of massive head injuries. During the race, local driver Pablo Pessatti was also killed when his car overturned, and he was thrown out.

Classification

References

Buenos Aires Grand Prix
Buenos Aires Grand Prix (I)
Buenos Aires Grand Prix